John Gallacher (born 26 January 1969 in Scotland) is a Scottish retired footballer.

Career

In 1989, Gallacher signed for Newcastle United in the English second division. However, he left because of injury and played for English lower league side Hartlepool United before retiring. He now works as a manager at the supermarket Aldi.

References

External links
 toon1892 Profile

Scottish footballers
Living people
Association football wingers
1969 births